State Route 83 (SR 83), also or primarily known as Euclid Avenue, is a state highway and city street in the U.S. state of California. Officially, SR 83 runs from the Chino Valley Freeway (State Route 71) in Chino Hills north to the San Bernardino Freeway (Interstate 10) in Upland. Euclid Avenue then continues north through Upland to the unincorporated community of San Antonio Heights.

Euclid Avenue passes through several historic districts. A segment of the road is listed on the National Register of Historic Places.

Route description
Route 83 is a major north–south arterial serving the cities and communities of Western San Bernardino County. Known as Euclid Avenue for its entire 14-mile (23 km) length, the route begins at its southern terminus at the Chino Valley Freeway (State Route 71) and traverses the communities of Chino, Ontario, and Upland before reaching its northern terminus at the San Bernardino Freeway (Interstate 10). Euclid Avenue, as a city street in Upland, and later a county road in unincorporated San Bernardino County, then continues north into the unincorporated community of San Antonio Heights and provides direct access to Mount Baldy.

Through the communities of Ontario, and Upland, the route traverses several designated historic districts, with craftsman homes and civic buildings dating from the late 19th century lining either side of the street. South of the Pomona Freeway (State Route 60), Route 83 assumes the characteristics of a rural highway, narrowing to two lanes while passing through what was traditionally agricultural land.

SR 83 is part of the California Freeway and Expressway System, and is part of the National Highway System, a network of highways that are considered essential to the country's economy, defense, and mobility by the Federal Highway Administration.

History

The segment of Euclid Avenue from Philadelphia Street in Ontario north to 24th Street in Upland was added to the National Register of Historic Places as a historic district in 2005.

Originally, SR 83 extended north from I-10 to the Foothill Freeway (State Route 210) in Upland, but the state relinquished that segment and turned it over to local control. There has never been any direct connection from Euclid Avenue to the Foothill Freeway (State Route 210) in Upland. During the planning stages for the construction of the Foothill Freeway through the area, Upland residents (in conjunction with the residents of other communities along the route) successfully petitioned the State and local governments to require Caltrans to construct the new freeway 'below grade', i.e. build the road surface of the freeway below the elevation of the surrounding terrain. Furthermore, due to concerns of existing traffic volume, noise, etc. along major thoroughfares, such as Euclid Avenue, many Upland residents who lived along or near Euclid Avenue did not want a fully functional interchange at the junction between the new freeway and the street as it was anticipated that doing so would increase traffic and noise, thereby undermining the aesthetic qualities of the street and negatively affecting the residents' "quality of life". Thus, at the intersection of SR 83 and SR 210, there are no on/offramps or associated improvements like traffic lights - direct access between the highways is not possible. Instead, on both sides of the Euclid Avenue overpass there are two wide landscaped areas that provide a visual (and to a lesser extent, acoustic) buffer between the street and the freeway passing below . The landscaped area also serves to provide continuity with the landscaped segments of the street to the north and south of the intersection.

Major intersections

See also

References

External links

California @ AARoads.com - State Route 83
Caltrans: Route 83 highway conditions
California Highways: SR 83

083
Roads in San Bernardino County, California
National Register of Historic Places in San Bernardino County, California
083
Ontario, California
Upland, California
Chino Hills, California